The 2015–16 Moldovan "A" Division season is the 25th since its establishment. A total of 14 teams are contesting the league.

Teams

League table

Results

Top goalscorers

Updated to matches played on 28 May 2016.

References

External links
Divizia A - Moldova - Results, fixtures, tables and news - Soccerway

Moldovan Liga 1 seasons
2
Moldova 2